Shangfang may refer to the following locations in China:

 Shangfang Mountain (Beijing) (上方山), in Fangshan District, with an elevation of 860 metres
 Shangfang Mountain (Suzhou) (上方山), Jiangsu
 Shangfang, Zhejiang (上方镇), town in Qujiang District, Quzhou
 Shangfang Township, Hebei (上方乡), in Xingtang County
 Shangfang Township, Jiangxi (上坊乡), in Wannian County
 
Shangfang also refer to:

 Petitioning (China)